The following ships of the Royal Danish Navy have borne the name HDMS Valkyrien:

 , lost at the Battle of Copenhagen (1801)
  a corvette in service 1846-1867
  a cruiser launched in 1888 and sold for scrap in 1923

References

Royal Danish Navy ship names